Rineloricaria sanga is a species of catfish in the family Loricariidae. It is native to South America, where it is known only from the Uruguay River basin near Iraí in the state of Rio Grande do Sul in Brazil. The species reaches 10 cm (3.9 inches) in standard length and is believed to be a facultative air-breather.

References 

Loricariini
Fish described in 2008
Catfish of South America
Fish of Brazil